Januszkowice may refer to the following places in Poland:
Januszkowice, Lower Silesian Voivodeship (south-west Poland)
Januszkowice, Subcarpathian Voivodeship (south-east Poland)
Januszkowice, Świętokrzyskie Voivodeship (south-central Poland)
Januszkowice, Opole Voivodeship (south-west Poland)